Ronald Pablo Baroni Ambrosi (born 8 April 1968) is a retired Peruvian international footballer who played as a striker. He played most successfully for Universitario de Deportes, where he was a prolific goalscorer.

Club career
Baroni was known for his great heading ability and powerful physique. He played for a number of clubs in South America, and had spells with FC Porto and FC Felgueiras in the Portuguese Liga as well as with Ankaragücü in the Turkish Süper Lig. He ended his career playing for Colombian team Deportivo Cali.

International career
Baroni made 19 appearances for the senior Peru national football team from 1993 to 1995.

Honours

Club
Universitario de Deportes:
Peruvian First Division (2): 1992, 1993

References

External links

1968 births
Living people
Footballers from Lima
Peruvian people of Italian descent
Association football forwards
Peruvian footballers
Peru international footballers
Peruvian expatriate footballers
Quilmes Atlético Club footballers
Rosario Central footballers
O'Higgins F.C. footballers
Deportes Concepción (Chile) footballers
Club Universitario de Deportes footballers
FC Porto players
F.C. Felgueiras players
MKE Ankaragücü footballers
FBC Melgar footballers
Deportivo Cali footballers
Peruvian Primera División players
Süper Lig players
Primeira Liga players
Categoría Primera A players
Peruvian expatriate sportspeople in Argentina
Peruvian expatriate sportspeople in Chile
Peruvian expatriate sportspeople in Colombia
Peruvian expatriate sportspeople in Portugal
Peruvian expatriate sportspeople in Turkey
Expatriate footballers in Argentina
Expatriate footballers in Chile
Expatriate footballers in Colombia
Expatriate footballers in Portugal
Expatriate footballers in Turkey
1995 Copa América players